Comps-sur-Artuby (literally Comps on Artuby) is a commune in the Var department in the Provence-Alpes-Côte d'Azur region in southeastern France.

It is the nearest town to the eastern entrance to the Gorges du Verdon.

Geography

Climate

Comps-sur-Artuby has a warm-summer Mediterranean climate (Köppen climate classification Csb).

See also
Communes of the Var department

References

Communes of Var (department)